The Art Pepper Quartet is an album by saxophonist Art Pepper featuring sessions from 1956 recorded for the Tampa label. The album was reissued on CD in the Original Jazz Classics series with bonus tracks in 1994.

Reception

The AllMusic review by Scott Yanow observed: "The quality of the music here is high, if brief -- even with his erratic lifestyle, Pepper never made a bad record ... Fine music, but not essential when one considers how many gems Art Pepper recorded during his rather hectic life".

Track listing 
All compositions by Art Pepper, except where indicated.
 "Art's Opus" - 5:48
 "I Surrender Dear" (Harry Barris, Gordon Clifford) - 5:31
 "Diane" - 3:35
 "Pepper Pot" - 5:03
 "Bésame Mucho" (Consuelo Velázquez, Sunny Skylar) - 4:00
 "Blues at Twilight" - 3:58
 "Val's Pal" - 2:03
 "Pepper Pot" [alternate take] - 2:27 Bonus track on CD reissue
 "Blues at Twilight" [alternate take] - 4:02 Bonus track on CD reissue
 "Val's Pal" [take 1] - 2:26 Bonus track on CD reissue
 "Val's Pal" [take 4] - 2:22 Bonus track on CD reissue
 "Val's Pal" [take 5] - 2:14 Bonus track on CD reissue

Personnel 
Art Pepper - alto saxophone
Russ Freeman - piano
Ben Tucker - bass 
Gary Frommer - drums

References 

1957 albums
Art Pepper albums